Zhejiang University City College (ZUCC) is an independent college which has a connection to the Zhejiang University following the 'independent college' configuration in China. Since 2020, as China's new policy that the independent colleges should have a clean cut with the universities that they were connected to, ZUCC is renamed as 'Zheda City College ' .

Zhejiang University and the Hangzhou city government jointly established ZUCC in 1999. It has  of area. It has undergraduate bachelor's degree and graduate programs such as master's degree. The student body includes international students.

References

External links
 Zhejiang University City College
 Zhejiang University City College 

Former affiliates of Zhejiang University
Education in Hangzhou
1999 establishments in China
Educational institutions established in 1999